Cossinia australiana is a species of seasonal rainforest trees endemic to restricted areas of Queensland, Australia, and constituting part of the plant family Sapindaceae.

They are found only in restricted habitat areas of central-eastern to southeastern Queensland.

Both the Australian national and Queensland state governments have given the official conservation status of "endangered" for this species' remaining populations of trees.

Within their endemic region the trees grow naturally in habitats of seasonal–drought adapted rainforests and associated vegetation types not adapted to fire, typically on nutrient–rich soils derived from basalt parent materials, which have historically had their native vegetation extensively destroyed and  been further threatened.

This species name and description was formally published for the first time in 1982 by Sally T. Reynolds of the Queensland Herbarium.

References

External links

Flora of Queensland
Dodonaeoideae
Sapindales of Australia
Taxa named by Sally T. Reynolds